Suizhong North railway station is a railway station of Qinhuangdao–Shenyang high-speed railway, located in Suizhong County, Huludao, Liaoning Province, China.

Railway stations in Liaoning